Augustus Jackson (April 16, 1808 – January 11, 1852) was an African-American ice cream maker and confectioner from Philadelphia, Pennsylvania. Jackson served as a chef in the White House during the 1820s.

Career 
After leaving the White House in the late 1820s, Jackson moved to Philadelphia and created his own successful catering business.  He also developed ice cream flavors which he packaged in tin cans and distributed to other ice cream parlors in Philadelphia. Jackson eventually became one of the city's wealthiest residents at the time.

Now known as the "father of ice cream," Jackson is said to have pioneered some of its modern manufacturing methods, namely the practice of adding salt to the ice. Although mentions of salt and ice being used is mentioned as early as 1711 by Mary Eales Eales in her book. Mrs Mary Eales's Receipts. Additionally, Jackson developed techniques to control the custard while it was freezing. There is no evidence that Jackson patented any of his recipes or techniques.

By 1928 an article in Capper's Weekly attributed Jackson as the first to make modern ice cream.

Bibliography

Inline references

General references 

<li> Lowe, Cliff (2004). "The History of Ice Cream, How to Make Ice Cream at Home – Ice Cream Makers Past & Present". The Ice Cream Man – via Wayback Machine. Retrieved January 6, 2010.
<li> Stradley, Linda.  "History of Ices & Ice Cream", What's Cooking America. (2004)

Further reading

1808 births
1852 deaths
Confectioners
Businesspeople from Philadelphia
White House Executive Chefs
Ice cream
19th-century American businesspeople